Éva Kóczián, later Kóczián-Földy (born May 25, 1936 in Budapest) is a former female international table tennis player from Hungary.

Table tennis career
She won twelve medals in singles, doubles, and team events in the World Table Tennis Championships and in the Table Tennis European Championships.

The twelve World Championship medals included a gold medal in the mixed doubles at the 1955 World Table Tennis Championships with Kálmán Szepesi.

She also won four English Open titles.

Personal life
Her brother József Kóczián was also a table tennis player. She married fellow table tennis international László Földy.

See also
 List of table tennis players
 List of World Table Tennis Championships medalists

References

 Results of Hungarian table tennis players at Sport.hu

1936 births
Living people
Hungarian female table tennis players
Table tennis players from Budapest